Recep İvedik 4 It is the sequel to Recep İvedik 3, which was released on February 21, 2014. It was directed by Togan Gökbakar and written by Şahan Gökbakar. The producer of the film was Emrah Çoban. Şahan Gökbakar played the main character of the movie.

Storyline 
Recep Ivedik coaches the children football team in his neighborhood. For the training he uses the only free piece of land as football field on which he used to play football as a child. Recep notices sadly that this piece of land was sold to a businessman.

Cast 

 Şahan Gökbakar as Recep İvedik
 İrfan Kangı as Mr. Irfan
 Cem Korkmaz as Halil Ibrahim
 Barış Bulut as Taylan
 Ece İncebay as Aslıhan

Sequels 

2014 films

Warner Bros. films
Turkish comedy films
Turkish sequel films
Films shot in Istanbul
Films set in Istanbul
Films shot in the Maldives
2014 comedy films
2010s Turkish-language films
Films directed by Togan Gökbakar